Frutos Saavedra Meneses (25 October 1823 – 23 October 1868) was a Spanish soldier, geodesist and politician.

Biography 
He completed his training at the Military Academy in Segovia, where he became an instructor. He reached the rank of colonel.

Incorporated into the artillery corps, he represented this corps in the Spain Map Commission, where he made a friend of Carlos Ibáñez e Ibáñez de Ibero. They designed together a geodetic standard which was made in Paris by Jean Brunner. This instrument was used to measure the central base of the Spanish geodetic network.

He began his political career as a member of the Liberal Union for the constituency of Coruña and served four terms between 1860 and 1866. In 1864, he was appointed Director General of Public Works.

Saavedra was appointed in 1862 to the Spanish Royal Academy of Sciences because of his geodesic work. In 1867 he was also appointed academician of the Royal Spanish Academy, but was unable to access it due to his untimely death.

References

External links

 

Members of the Congress of Deputies (Spain)
Spanish military personnel
Spanish scientists